Hubcap Music is the sixth studio album by Seasick Steve. The title derives from his Morris Minor guitar made out of two hubcaps placed back-to-back. Steve uses the guitar frequently, both live and in the studio.

The song "Down On The Farm" was debuted live at the 2012 Pinkpop Festival in the Netherlands. A music video was also released, with Seasick Steve dancing behind his farm with the hubcap guitar in his hand, in similar fashion to The Black Keys' song, "Lonely Boy".

One week before the release, a video for "Purple Shadows" premiered, featuring Steve playing a stripped version of the song on the acoustic guitar.

Guests on the album include Dan Magnusson on drums (who also plays live with Seasick Steve), John Paul Jones on bass (amongst other instruments), and Jack White on guitar on the track "The Way I Do".

Track listing

Personnel
According to the official CD liner notes:

Seasick Steve – vocals, guitar
Dan Magnusson – percussion on all tracks except "Hope" and "Over You"; podorythmie on "Hope"
John Paul Jones – bass guitar on "Down on the Farm", "Keep on Keepin' On", "The Way I Do", "Freedom Road", "Home", "Heavy Weight" and "Coast Is Clear"; mandolin on "Over You"; lap steel ukulele on "Hope"; Hammond organ on "Coast Is Clear"; harmony vocals on "Over You"
Jack White – lead guitar on "The Way I Do"
Luther Dickinson – slide guitar on "Home"
Elizabeth Cook – vocals on "Purple Shadows"
Fats Kaplin – pedal steel guitar on "Purple Shadows" and "Heavy Weight"; fiddle on "Heavy Weight"

References

External links
Official website

2013 albums
Seasick Steve albums